The list of ship launches in 1906 includes a chronological list of ships launched in 1906.

References

Sources

1906
Ship launches